The 2004 CCHA Men's Ice Hockey Tournament was the 33rd CCHA Men's Ice Hockey Tournament in conference history. It was played between March 12 and March 20, 2004. First round games were played at campus sites, while all 'super six' games were played at Joe Louis Arena in Detroit, Michigan. By winning the tournament, Ohio State won the Mason Cup and received the Central Collegiate Hockey Association's automatic bid to the 2004 NCAA Division I Men's Ice Hockey Tournament.

Format
The tournament featured four rounds of play. In the First Round, the first and twelfth seeds, the second and eleventh seeds, the third and tenth seeds, the fourth and ninth seeds, the fifth and eighth seeds and the sixth and seventh seeds played a best-of-three series. All six victors in the first round advance as the newly minted 'Super Six' and play only single-elimination for the duration of the tournament. The top two ranked winners receive byes into the semifinals while the four other teams play in the quarterfinals to determine the other qualifiers. In the semifinals, the remaining highest and lowest seeds and second highest and second lowest seeds play a single-game, with the winners advancing to the finals. The tournament champion receives an automatic bid to the 2004 NCAA Men's Division I Ice Hockey Tournament.

Conference standings
Note: GP = Games played; W = Wins; L = Losses; T = Ties; PTS = Points; GF = Goals For; GA = Goals Against

Bracket
Teams are reseeded after the first round and quarterfinals

Note: * denotes overtime period(s)

First round

(1) Michigan vs. (12) Nebraska-Omaha

(2) Miami vs. (11) Lake Superior State

(3) Michigan State vs. (10) Ferris State

(4) Ohio State vs. (9) Bowling Green

(5) Notre Dame vs. (8) Western Michigan

(6) Alaska-Fairbanks vs. (7) Northern Michigan

Quarterfinals

(3) Michigan State vs. (7) Northern Michigan

(4) Ohio State vs. (5) Notre Dame

Semifinals

(1) Michigan vs. (7) Northern Michigan

(2) Miami vs. (4) Ohio State

Third Place

(2) Miami vs. (7) Northern Michigan

Championship

(1) Michigan vs. (4) Ohio State

Tournament awards

All-Tournament Team
F Brandon Kaleniecki (Michigan)
F Rod Pelley (Ohio State)
F Paul Caponigri* (Ohio State)
D Andy Greene (Miami)
D Doug Andress (Ohio State)
G Dave Caruso (Ohio State)
* Most Valuable Player(s)

References

External links

CCHA Men's Ice Hockey Tournament
Ccha tournament